The Island of Doctor Agor is a 1971 American short animated film written and directed by then-thirteen-year-old Tim Burton, who also starred in the title role of Doctor Agor.  The short is one of Burton's first animated films, and was adapted by Burton from the H. G. Wells 1896 novel The Island of Doctor Moreau.

The film starred Burton's friends and classmates and was shot with a Super 8 camera, utilizing locations such as the LA Zoo's animal cages and beaches in Malibu.

Cast 

 Tim Burton – Doctor Agor

Response 
Though the film was written about by Nancy Kilpatrick in the 2004 book The Goth Bible, in the 2005 book The Films of Tim Burton, author Alison McMahan concluded that because of the timing of an April 1 posting of an IMDb comment, the film listing is "likely" a joke.

However, in the 2006 book Burton on Burton, Burton himself specifically speaks of the film when recounting his early days making Super 8 films.

References

External links 
The Island of Doctor Agor at the Internet Movie Database
The Tim Burton Collective

Animated films directed by Tim Burton
Short films directed by Tim Burton
1971 films
Films based on works by H. G. Wells
The Island of Doctor Moreau
1970s English-language films